Fred Field may refer to:

 Fred Field (footballer) (1914–2004), English footballer 
 Fred A. Field (1850–1935), businessman and public official from Vermont
 Fred E. Field (1861–1931), American architect
 Fred Tarbell Field (1879–1950), judge in Massachusetts